Olive Township may refer to:

Illinois
 Olive Township, Madison County, Illinois

Indiana
 Olive Township, Elkhart County, Indiana
 Olive Township, St. Joseph County, Indiana

Iowa
 Olive Township, Clinton County, Iowa

Kansas
 Olive Township, Decatur County, Kansas

Michigan
 Olive Township, Clinton County, Michigan
 Olive Township, Ottawa County, Michigan

Nebraska
 Olive Township, Butler County, Nebraska

Ohio
 Olive Township, Meigs County, Ohio
 Olive Township, Noble County, Ohio

Township name disambiguation pages